Rachael Laws (born 5 November 1990) is an English footballer who plays as a goalkeeper, for Liverpool in the Women's Super League.

Early life
Laws was born in Newcastle upon Tyne, and studied at Gateshead College.

Playing career

Club
Laws first played for Liverpool during the 2013 FA WSL season. She played 9 games and helped her side win the title while battling for a place in the first team with Sarah Quantrill. She then signed for Sunderland on 31 December 2013 going on to make 36 appearances in the WSL. Following Sunderland's denial for a place in the 2018–19 FA WSL she joined Reading. She said in an interview with BBC Sport: "Reading is somewhere I want to personally be and thrive hopefully while I am here". On 8 June 2020, Reading announced that Laws had left the club after her contract had expired. On 7 July 2020, it was announced that Laws had joined recently relegated side Liverpool F.C. Women having previously been on loan to the club in 2013.

International career
Laws was called up by Mark Sampson in 2014 for England's World Cup qualification but was an unused substitute in a 10–0 away win against Montenegro.

Honours
 FA Women's Super League
Winner (1): 2013

 FA Women's Championship
Winner (2): 2014, 2022

References

External links

1990 births
Living people
Women's Super League players
Liverpool F.C. Women players
Sunderland A.F.C. Ladies players
Women's association football goalkeepers
Footballers from Newcastle upon Tyne
FA Women's National League players
English women's footballers